Kalle Koskinen (born January 3, 1972 in Jyväskylä, Finland) is a defenceman who played for the JYP hockey team in the Finnish SM-liiga. He retired at the conclusion of the 2012/13 season, after 5 seasons in his second spell with JYP Jyväskylä.

External links

References 

 
 

1972 births
Living people
Finnish ice hockey defencemen
JYP Jyväskylä players
Lahti Pelicans players
Timrå IK players
Sportspeople from Jyväskylä